The 1964 United States Senate election in Montana took place on November 3, 1964. Incumbent United States Senator Mike Mansfield, who was first elected to the Senate in 1952 and was re-elected in 1958, ran for re-election. Mansfield won the Democratic primary in a landslide, and advanced to the general election, where he faced Alex Blewett, the Majority Leader of the Montana House of Representatives and the Republican nominee. Though Mansfield's margin was quite reduced from 1958, he still overwhelmingly defeated Blewett and won his third term in the Senate in a landslide.

Democratic primary

Candidates
Mike Mansfield, incumbent United States Senator
Joseph P. Monaghan, former United States Congressman from Montana's 1st congressional district, 1936 independent candidate for the United States Senate

Results

Republican primary

Candidates
Alex Blewett, Majority Leader of the Montana House of Representatives
Lyman Brewster, rancher
Antoinette F. Rosell, State Representative

Results

General election

Results

References

Montana
1964
1964 Montana elections